Marvin Alton Melville  (born February 15, 1935) is a retired American alpine skier. He competed in the downhill event at the 1956 and 1960 Winter Olympics and placed 22nd in 1960.

Melville won the 1959 NCAA championships in the slalom and combined events. During his skiing career, he worked in construction in the summers to earn money for competing in the winters. After retiring from skiing, he served in the army, and then ran his ski school for children and coached the University of Utah ski team.

References

External links
 

1935 births
Living people
American male alpine skiers
Olympic alpine skiers of the United States
Alpine skiers at the 1956 Winter Olympics
Alpine skiers at the 1960 Winter Olympics
Skiers from Salt Lake City